An Oratory School is primarily any of several schools founded or initially operated by the Oratorians (priests of the Oratory of Saint Philip Neri), a congregation of Catholic priests. 

The term was also used early in the career of St. John Bosco, who went on to establish his followers as the Salesian priests and Brothers.

List of Oratory Schools
The Oratory School, Woodcote, Oxfordshire
The Oratory Preparatory School, Pangbourne, Oxfordshire 
The London Oratory School
Oratory Preparatory School, Summit, New Jersey
Oratory Athenaeum for University Preparation, Pharr, Texas

School types